In quantum optics, a superradiant phase transition is a phase transition that occurs in a collection of fluorescent emitters (such as atoms), between a state containing few electromagnetic excitations (as in the electromagnetic vacuum) and a superradiant state with many electromagnetic excitations trapped inside the emitters. The superradiant state is made thermodynamically favorable by having strong, coherent interactions between the emitters.

The superradiant phase transition was originally predicted by the Dicke model of superradiance, which assumes that atoms have only two energetic levels and that these interact with only one mode of the electromagnetic field.
The phase transition occurs when the strength of the interaction between the atoms and the field 
is greater than the energy of the non-interacting part of the system.  (This is similar to the case of superconductivity in ferromagnetism, which leads
to the dynamic interaction between ferromagnetic atoms and the spontaneous ordering of excitations below the critical temperature.)
The collective Lamb shift, relating to the system of atoms interacting with the vacuum fluctuations, becomes comparable to the energies of atoms alone, and the vacuum
fluctuations cause the spontaneous self-excitation of matter.

The transition can be readily understood by the use of the Holstein-Primakoff transformation applied to a two-level atom. 
As a result of this transformation, the atoms become Lorentz harmonic oscillators 
with frequencies equal to the difference between the energy levels. The whole system then simplifies to a system of interacting harmonic oscillators of atoms, and the field known as Hopfield dielectric which further predicts in the normal state 
polarons for photons or polaritons.
If the interaction with the field is so strong that the system collapses in the harmonic approximation 
and complex polariton frequencies (soft modes) appear, then the physical system with nonlinear terms of the higher order
becomes the system with the Mexican hat-like potential, and will undergo 
ferroelectric-like phase transition.
In this model, the system is mathematically equivalent for one mode of excitation to the Trojan wave packet, 
when the circularly polarized field intensity corresponds to the electromagnetic coupling constant. Above the critical value, it changes to the unstable motion of the ionization.

The superradiant phase transition was the subject of a wide discussion as to whether or not it is only a result of the simplified model of the matter-field interaction; and if it can occur for the real physical parameters of physical systems (a no-go theorem). However, both the original derivation and the later corrections leading to nonexistence of the transition – due to Thomas–Reiche–Kuhn sum rule canceling for the harmonic oscillator the needed inequality to impossible negativity of the interaction – were based on the assumption that the quantum field operators are commuting numbers, and the atoms do not interact with the static Coulomb forces. This is generally not true like in case of Bohr–van Leeuwen theorem and the classical non-existence of Landau diamagnetism. The return of the transition basically occurs because the inter-atom dipole-dipole interactions are never negligible in the superradiant matter density regime and the Power-Zienau unitary transformation eliminating the quantum vector potential in the minimum-coupling Hamiltonian transforms the Hamiltonian exactly to the form used when it was discovered and without the square of the vector potential which was later claimed to prevent it. Alternatively within the full quantum mechanics including the electromagnetic field  the generalized Bohr–van Leeuwen theorem does not work and
the electromagnetic interactions cannot be fully eliminated while they only change the  vector potential coupling to the electric field  coupling and alter the effective electrostatic interactions. It can be observed in model systems like  Bose–Einstein condensates 
and artificial atoms.

Theory

Criticality of  linearized Jaynes-Cummings model

A superradiant phase transition is formally predicted by the critical behavior of the resonant Jaynes-Cummings model, describing the interaction of only one atom with one mode of the electromagnetic field.
Starting from the exact Hamiltonian of the Jaynes-Cummings model at resonance

Applying the Holstein-Primakoff transformation for two spin levels, 
replacing the spin raising and lowering operators by those for the harmonic oscillators

one gets the Hamiltonian of two coupled harmonic-oscillators:

which readily can be diagonalized.
Postulating its normal form 

where

one gets the eigenvalue equation

with the solutions

The system collapses when one of the frequencies becomes imaginary, i.e. when

or when the atom-field coupling is stronger than the frequency of the mode and atom oscillators.
While there are physically higher terms in the true system, the system in this regime will therefore undergo the 
phase transition.

Criticality of Jaynes-Cummings model

The simplified Hamiltonian of the Jaynes-Cummings model, neglecting the counter-rotating terms, is

and the energies for the case of zero detuning are

where  is the Rabi frequency.
One can approximately calculate the canonical partition function

 ,
where the discrete sum was replaced by the integral.

The normal approach is that the latter integral is calculated by the Gaussian approximation around
the maximum of the exponent:

 

 

This leads to the critical equation

 

This has the solution only if

 

which means that the normal, and the superradiant phase, exist only if the field-atom coupling is significantly stronger 
than the energy difference between the atom levels.
When the condition is fulfilled, the equation gives the solution for the order parameter  depending on the inverse of the 
temperature , which means non-vanishing ordered field mode.
Similar considerations can be done in true thermodynamic limit of the infinite number of atoms.

Instability of the classical electrostatic model

The better insight on the nature of the superradiant phase transition as well on the physical value of the critical parameter which must be exceeded 
in order for the transition to occur may be obtained by studying the classical stability of the system of the charged classical harmonic oscillators in the 3D space interacting only with the electrostatic repulsive forces for example between electrons in the locally harmonic oscillator potential. Despite of the original model of the superradiance the quantum electromagnetic field is totally neglected here. The oscillators may be assumed to be placed for example on the cubic lattice with the lattice constant  in the analogy to the crystal system of the condensed matter.
The worse scenario of the defect of the absence of the two out-of-the-plane motion-stabilizing electrons from the 6-th nearest neighbors of a chosen electron is assumed while the four nearest electrons are first assumed to be rigid in space and producing the anti-harmonic potential in the direction perpendicular to the plane of the all five electrons. The condition of the instability of motion of the chosen electron is that the net potential being the superposition of the
harmonic oscillator potential and the quadratically expanded Coulomb potential from the four electrons is negative i.e.
 
or
 
Making it artificially quantum by multiplying the numerator and the denominator of the fraction by the  one obtains 
the condition 
 
where 
 
is the square of the dipole transition strength between the ground state and the first excited state of the quantum harmonic oscillator, 
 
is the energy gap between consecutive levels and it is also noticed that 
 
is the spatial density of the oscillators.
The condition is almost identical to this obtained in the original discovery of the superradiant phase transition when replacing the harmonic oscillators with two level atoms with the same distance between the energy levels, dipole transition strength, and the density which means that it occurs in the regime 
when the Coulomb interactions between electrons dominate over locally harmonic oscillatory influence of the atoms. It that sense the free 
electron gas with 
is also purely superradiant. 

The critical inequality rewritten yet differently
 
expresses the fact that superradiant phase transition occurs when the frequency of the binding atomic oscillators is lower than 
so called electron gas plasma frequency.

References

Quantum mechanics
Phase transitions